The 1935 Marquette Golden Avalanche football team was an American football team that represented Marquette University as an independent during the 1935 college football season. In its 14th season under head coach Frank Murray, the team compiled a 7–1 record and outscored its opponents by a total of 173 to 65. Its victories including major college opponents, Wisconsin, Ole Miss, and Michigan State, and its sole loss was to Temple. The team played its home games at Marquette Stadium in Milwaukee.

Schedule

References

Marquette
Marquette Golden Avalanche football seasons
Marquette Golden Avalanche football